Michael: Every Day, formerly known as Michael: Tuesdays and Thursdays, is a Canadian television sitcom that debuted on CBC Television in 2011.

Described by the National Post as a cross between What About Bob? and Frasier, the show stars Matt Watts as Michael, a neurotic young man undergoing regular psychotherapy, and Bob Martin as David, his therapist who views Michael as an ideal guinea pig for the experimental psychiatric techniques he hopes will turn him into a bestselling pop psychology writer. Filmed in Ottawa, Ontario, the show's cast also includes Jennifer Irwin, Pablo Silveira, Martha Burns and Tommie-Amber Pirie.

The series is based in part on Watts' own past struggles with anxiety disorder.

Episodes

Season 1
The series was greenlit in February 2011, shot during June of that year at an average episode budget of $150,000 CAD and premiered on CBC on September 14, 2011, at 9 pm. After two episodes, the series was moved to Tuesdays at 9PM. The show was not renewed for the 2012–13 season.

The first season was released on DVD in Canada in 2014 by VideoWorks. In 2015, it became available in the United States through Hulu. In Canada, it is available to stream through the CBC's website.

Season 2
In March 2015, the CBC announced that the series would return with six new episodes in the 2015–16 season. The new episodes were ultimately delayed, however, and premiered in January 2017 under the new series title Michael: Every Day. The series was not renewed for a third season.

Reception
The show's premiere episode garnered low ratings, with 199,000 viewers watching. The rest of the season averaged around 250,000 viewers.

References

External links

2011 Canadian television series debuts
2017 Canadian television series endings
CBC Television original programming
Television shows filmed in Ottawa
2010s Canadian sitcoms